Glyptostrobus pensilis, known in Chinese as 水松 (Shuǐ sōng), and also Chinese swamp cypress, is an endangered conifer, and the sole living species in the genus Glyptostrobus.

Description
Like the related genus Taxodium, it produces 'cypress knees', or pneumatophores, when growing in water, thought to help transport oxygen to the roots.

Distribution and habitat
G. pensilis is native to subtropical southeastern China, from Fujian west to southeast Yunnan, and also very locally in northern Vietnam and Laos.

Conservation
The species is nearly extinct in the wild due to overcutting for its valuable decay-resistant, scented wood, but it is also fairly widely planted along the banks of rice paddies where its roots help to stabilise the banks by reducing soil erosion. There appear to be no remaining wild plants in China and few of those in Vietnam are seed-bearing. A population of Chinese swamp cypress was recently discovered in central Laos. The species is found in several botanical gardens around the world. It was previously reported that there were four specimens of this tree growing in Bank Hall Gardens, Lancashire, United Kingdom, but it has now been confirmed that they are in fact the swamp or bald cypress from the southeastern USA, Taxodium distichum.

Gallery

References

External links
Arboretum de Villardebelle: photo of cone

Cupressaceae
Critically endangered plants
Plants described in 1873
Trees of China
Flora of Guangxi
Trees of Vietnam
Trees of Laos
Deciduous conifers